The Politics of Lower Saxony takes place within a framework of a federal parliamentary representative democratic republic, where the Federal Government of Germany exercises sovereign rights with certain powers reserved to the states of Germany including Lower Saxony. Since 1948 politics in the state has been dominated by the rightist Christian Democratic Union (CDU) and the leftist Social Democratic Party. Lower Saxony was one of the origins of the German environmentalist movement in reaction to the state government's support for underground nuclear waste disposal. This led to the formation of the German Green Party in 1980.

Prime Minister 

The Prime Minister of Lower Saxony is the head of government of Lower Saxony. The current Prime Minister is Stephan Weil.

Election results 

In the most recent state election in 2013, the ruling Christian Democratic Union (CDU) held on to its position as the leading party in the state, despite losing votes and seats. The CDU's coalition with the Free Democratic Party (FDP) however lost its majority to a coalition of the Social Democratic Party of Germany (SPD) and the Party Alliance 90/The Greens (The Greens). They have since ruled in a coalition with a one vote majority.

The election saw the exit out of the state parliament of the leftist The Left party, which had gained representation for the first time in 2008.

References